In computer programming, create, read, update, and delete (often referred to via the acronym CRUD) are the four basic operations of persistent storage. CRUD is also sometimes used to describe user interface conventions that facilitate viewing, searching, and changing information using computer-based forms and reports.

History 
The term was likely first popularized by James Martin in his 1983 book Managing the data-base environment.

Conceptual 
Data can be put in a location/area of a storage mechanism. 

 The fundamental feature of a storage location is that its content is both readable and updatable.
 Before a storage location can be read or updated it needs to be created; that is allocated and initialized with content. 
 At some later point, the storage location may need to be destructed; that is finalized and deallocated.

Together these four operations make up the basic operations of storage management known as CRUD: Create, Read, Update and Delete.

Databases 
The acronym CRUD refers to the major operations which are implemented by databases. Each letter in the acronym can be mapped to a standard Structured Query Language (SQL) statement.

Although relational databases are a common persistence layer in software applications, numerous other persistence layers exist. CRUD functionality can for example be implemented with document databases, object databases, XML databases, text files, or binary files. 

Some big data systems do not implement UPDATE, but have only a timestamped INSERT (journaling), storing a completely new version of the object each time.

RESTful APIs 

The acronym CRUD also appears in the discussion of RESTful APIs. Each letter in the acronym may be mapped to a Hypertext Transfer Protocol (HTTP) method:

In HTTP, the GET (read), PUT (create and update), POST (create - if we don't have `id` or `uuid`), and DELETE (delete) methods are CRUD operations as they have storage management semantics, meaning that they let user agents directly manipulate the states of target resources. The POST method, on the other hand, is a process operation that has target-resource-specific semantics which typically exceed the scope of CRUD operations.

User Interface 

CRUD is also relevant at the user interface level of most applications. For example, in address book software, the basic storage unit is an individual contact entry. As a bare minimum, the software must allow the user to: 
 Create, or add new entries
 Read, retrieve, search, or view existing entries
 Update, or edit existing entries
 Delete, deactivate, or remove existing entries

Because these operations are so fundamental, they are often documented and described under one comprehensive heading such as "contact management" or "document management" in general.

Other variations 
Other variations of CRUD include:
 ABCD (add, browse, change, delete)
 CRUDL (create, read, update, delete, list)
BREAD (browse, read, edit, add, delete)
 DAVE (delete, add, view, edit)
 CRAP (create, replicate, append, process)

See also 
 Representational state transfer (REST)
 Active record pattern
 Data manipulation language
 Input/output
 ACID
 Query by Example
 Command–query separation
 Scaffold (programming)

References